Jean Ann Black is an American make-up artist best known for her work on films, particularly as a long-time collaborator with David Fincher, the Coen Brothers, Julia Roberts and especially Brad Pitt.

Filmography 
 A Serious Man
 Big Fish
 Born on the Fourth of July
 By the Sea
 Derailed
 Faster
 Greenberg
 No Country for Old Men
 Ocean's Eleven
 Ocean's Thirteen
 Seven
 Spy Game
 The Big Lebowski
 The Curious Case of Benjamin Button
 The Ring
 The Tree of Life
 The Twilight Saga: Breaking Dawn – Part 1
 The Twilight Saga: Breaking Dawn – Part 2
 Water for Elephants

External links

Living people
American make-up artists
Year of birth missing (living people)